Salvia lavandulifolia (Spanish sage) is a small woody herbaceous perennial native to Spain and southern France, growing in rocky soil in Maquis shrubland, often found growing with rosemary, Lavandula lanata, and Genista cinerea.

The leaves grow opposite each other on the stem and appear to grow in bunches. When the leaves are rubbed, oils give off a fragrance similar to rosemary. These oils are used for scenting soaps. The flowering stems have very few flowers on widely spaced whorls. Some varieties have a dark calyx.

Biochemistry
The essential oil of S. lavandulifolia has been found to have a selective acetylcholinesterase-inhibiting effect, (in as far as the regions of the brain in which acetylcholinesterase activity has been demonstrated, such areas are striatum and hippocampus) with an IC50 value of 0.03 μg/ml. The chief reason for this activity are believed to be the monoterpenes 1,8-cineole and α-pinene which have IC50 values of 0.67 and 0.63 mM, respectively.

Medical effects 
A 2003 study indicated that S. lavandulifolia improves word recall in healthy young adults.

References

External links
 
 

lavandulifolia
Flora of France
Flora of Spain
Taxa named by Martin Vahl